Piz Murtera (3,044 m) is a mountain of the Silvretta Alps, overlooking Susch in the Swiss canton of Graubünden. It is the culminating point of the small group lying south of the Vereina Pass, between the Val Fless and the Val Sagliains.

References

External links
 Piz Murtera on Hikr

Mountains of Graubünden
Mountains of the Alps
Alpine three-thousanders
Mountains of Switzerland
Zernez